Guryevsky District is an administrative district (raion), one of the fifteen in Kaliningrad Oblast, Russia. As a municipal division, it is incorporated as Guryevsky Urban Okrug. It is located in the west of the oblast. Its administrative center is the town of Guryevsk. Population:  47,330 (2002 Census);  The population of Guryevsk accounts for 23.5% of the district's total population.

Geography
The district is situated around Kaliningrad, the administrative center of the oblast. For this reason the main railway lines and roads pass through the district.

To the north the district reaches the Curonian Lagoon, to the southwest—the Vistula Lagoon. In the west, parted from the rest of the district by Kaliningrad, the town of Svetly is located on the Vistula Lagoon.

Administrative and municipal status
Within the framework of administrative divisions, Guryevsky District is one of the fifteen in the oblast. The town of Guryevsk serves as its administrative center.

As a municipal division, the district has been incorporated as Guryevsky Urban Okrug since May 31, 2013. Prior to that date, the district was incorporated as Guryevsky Municipal District, which was subdivided into one urban settlement and seven rural settlements, including Orekhovka.

References

Notes

Sources

Districts of Kaliningrad Oblast
 
